This list includes Immovable Cultural Heritage sites (listed by the ) in the Kosovska Mitrovica District of Serbia – which, except for not including the municipality of Orahovac, overlaps with the District of Peja and District of Gjakova of Kosovo.

Cultural monuments

Exceptional importance 

|}

Listed

Archaeological sites

Historic landmarks

Spatial cultural-historical units

See also 
 Immovable Cultural Heritage of Exceptional Importance (Serbia)
 Immovable Cultural Heritage of Great Importance (Serbia)
 Monuments of Kosovo

Notes

References 

Cultural heritage of Serbia
Monuments and memorials in Serbia
Monuments and memorials in Kosovo